George Younger, 1st Viscount Younger of Leckie (13 October 1851 – 29 April 1929) was a British politician.

Early life
George Younger was born on 13 October 1851. He was educated at Edinburgh Academy.

Career
Younger left college at the age of 17 on his father's death to run the family brewery of George Younger and Son, the business founded by his great-grandfather, George Younger (baptised 17 February 1722), of Alloa, Clackmannanshire. He became chairman in 1897.

Younger was a Deputy Lieutenant of Clackmannanshire from November 1901, and Unionist Party member of parliament for Ayr Burghs from 1906 until 1922. He was also Chairman of the Unionist Party Organisation from 1916 to 1923, and Treasurer of the Unionist Party in 1923. He was created a baronet on 12 July 1911, and later Viscount Younger of Leckie on 20 February 1923.

Death and legacy
Younger died on 29 April 1929. One of his great-grandsons was the Conservative politician George Younger, 4th Viscount Younger of Leckie (1931–2003), who held ministerial office as Secretary of State for Scotland from 1979 to 1986, and Secretary of State for Defence from 1986 to 1989.

Family
His son, Charles, was a first-class cricketer who was killed in the First World War.

References

 Burke's Peerage & Baronetage (106th edition, 1999). Editor-in-chief: Charles Mosley; publisher: Burke's Peerage (Genealogical Books) Ltd.

External links
 

1851 births
1929 deaths
Deputy Lieutenants of Clackmannanshire
People educated at Edinburgh Academy
Lord-Lieutenants of Stirlingshire
Younger, George
Viscounts in the Peerage of the United Kingdom
Scottish businesspeople
Younger, George
Younger, George
Younger, George
Younger, George
Younger, George
UK MPs who were granted peerages
Scottish brewers
Chairmen of the Conservative Party (UK)
Unionist Party (Scotland) MPs
Viscounts created by George V